Job creep is a phenomenon in which employers continually require increasing amounts of work relative to the normal requirements of their operations.

References

Working conditions